Mainsville is an unincorporated community in Southampton Township in Franklin County, in the U.S. state of Pennsylvania.

History
Mainsville was founded ca. the 1860s.

References

Unincorporated communities in Franklin County, Pennsylvania
Unincorporated communities in Pennsylvania